Jean-Michel Arnold, (1938 - September 4, 2019) is General Secretary of the Cinémathèque Française, vice President of UNESCO's IFTC (International Council for Film Television and Audiovisual Communication), founder of the Cinéma du Réel, Director of CNRS Image/Media, General Secretary of RIAVS, and President of CAMERA.  Without being a filmmaker, Mr. Arnold has been the instigator of some very important events in the world of cinema.

Early life

He was the only child of Christine Brisset, an activist known as the “Pasionaria of the Poor”, with a street named in her honour and her life documented on film. His father died around the time of his birth. At the age of 15, he left his home town of Angers and headed for Paris.

There he was befriended by Henri Langlois, founder of the Cinémathèque Française, “one of the most important figures in the history of film” who became his mentor and spiritual father. At the instigation of Langlois, he went out to the newly independent Algeria and helped found the Cinémathèque Nationale Algérienne first with Ahmed Hocine and later with Boudjema Karèche and helped organise the “Rencontres des Cinémas du Monde” at the first Panafrican Cultural Festival in 1969 (the second was forty years later in August 2009).

Career

CNRS Image/Média

In 1974 the CNRS (the French National Scientific Research Council) appointed him director of a newly formed audiovisual division “CNRSAV” (initially called Service d'étude de réalisation et de diffusion de documents audio-visuels  or SERDDAV) and finally simplified to “CNRS Image/Média” which he headed until 2001 and for which he was awarded “La Medaille de Cristal” for his creativity and innovation.

Under his direction it was responsible for the production of hundreds of film productions, TV programs, film expeditions, multimedia packages and seminars dedicated to science and the arts.

He created formal links with La Fémis, The French State Film School whose first President was Jean-Claude Carrière (also President of RIAVS), and with UNESCO's IFTC.

In 1977 together with Jean Rouch he founded the Cinéma du Réel

RIAVS Rencontres Internationales de l’Audiovisuel Scientifique

In 1976 he created the Rencontres Internationales de l’Audiovisuel Scientifique (RIAVS) an annual event lasting several weeks during which scientists, artists, movie makers, TV producers and the public meet at the Eiffel Tower and UNESCO to celebrate “a débauche of initiatives, projections, discussions and exhibitions”.

As Koïchiro Matsuura, Director General of UNESCO, wrote: “it is a unique initiative supported by UNESCO… which brings together in one place: science, culture, communication and education”

There are special screenings of rare cinema items, Symposia (see pictures on right) and the official Festival program, some of which are detailed below:

 The International Festival of TV Science Programs
This is the core Festival. It started as a means of bringing together two groups who hardly knew each other, on the one hand the scientists working in their laboratories and on the other the media. It has now grown to become an iconic meeting place at the Eiffel Tower for science and the media.

More than 300 TV production companies from 66 countries in 5 continents submit TV Science programs for several prizes: namely a) the Grand Prix; b) Prix Special du Jury; c) Prix pour l’Imagerie Scientifique; d) Prix Aventures et Decouvertes; e) Prix Science et Societe; f) Prix Sante; g) Prix Jeunesse; h) Prix du Magazine; and i) Mention Speciale du Jury

 Prix Argos
This is a prize which is awarded each year to those web sites which show startling originality, unpredictability and the ability to create new affinities across continents

 Prix Jules Verne
This is a prize which is awarded each year to a TV company not for any individual TV program but for their policy towards their viewing public as expressed by the quality of their TV programs overall 
 
 Prix l’Affiche du Monde
This is a prize which is awarded each year to the best movie produced by a film school (in cooperation with CILECT) and for the best movie by a non-professional (in cooperation with UNICA)

CAMERA

He is President of CAMERA (Conseil Audiovisuel Mondial pour les Etudes et les Réalisations sur l'Art) an organization which promotes creativity, education and culture by means of symposia, production and awards.

CAMERA is on the executive committee of UNESCO's IFTC and, in coproduction with the French Ministère des Relations Extérieures, it produced a series of movies on “Les peintres cinéastes”.

CAMERA is most celebrated for “Le Prix CAMERA” which is awarded each year at UNESCO to
 a City
 a Foundation
 a Film/TV Production Company
 a Publisher
 a Museum
which has shown the most outstanding contribution to Culture and Education

As President of CAMERA he also has the responsibility of advising UNESCO with regard to its  initiative to select "Creative Cities of Cinema"

Cinémathèque Française
He has been associated with the Cinémathèque Française ever since his first meeting with Henri Langlois at the age of 15. He was elected General Secretary in 1981 and has been consistently re-elected since then, working closely with past Presidents, Jean Rouch, Jean-Charles Tacchella, and Claude Berri and with the current President Costa-Gavras.

UNESCO

He was elected President of the International Council for Film Television and Audiovisual Communication (IFTC) at UNESCO in 2000 and is currently its vice President. The IFTC is UNESCO's advisory body on all matters concerned with film, television and new media. It has functioned for over 50 years as an independent NGO in official formal associate relations with UNESCO, based at UNESCO's headquarters in Paris.

References

UNESCO officials
French activists
French officials of the United Nations
1938 births
2019 deaths